William Albert Shibley (October 7, 1876 – April 27, 1926) was an American football coach. He served as the head football coach at the University of Mississippi (Ole Miss) in 1901. During his one-season tenure at Ole Miss, Shibley compiled an overall record of two wins and four losses (2–4).  Shibley was an alumnus of the University of Virginia. He played college football for the Virginia Cavaliers in 1899.

Head coaching record

References

External links
 

1876 births
1926 deaths
19th-century players of American football
Ole Miss Rebels football coaches
Virginia Cavaliers football players
People from Van Buren, Arkansas
Players of American football from Arkansas